Charles William Chech (April 27, 1878 – January 31, 1938) was a pitcher who played in Major League Baseball between 1905 and 1909. Chech batted and threw right-handed. He was born in Madison, Wisconsin.

A curveball specialist, Chech reached the majors in 1905 with the Cincinnati Reds, spending two years with them before moving to the Cleveland Naps 1908 and Boston Red Sox (1909). His most productive season came in his rookie year for Cincinnati, when he recorded career-highs in wins (14), strikeouts (79), starts (25), complete games (20) and innings pitched 267, while posting a 2.89 ERA. After going 11–7 for Cleveland, he was sent to the Red Sox with Jack Ryan in the same trade that brought Cy Young to Boston.
  
In a four-season career, Chech posted a 33–30 record with 187 strikeouts and a 2,52 ERA in 606 innings. Following his Major League career, he played for the St. Paul Apostles of the American Association.

Chech died in Los Angeles, at the age of 59.

External links

Baseball Library
Retrosheet

1878 births
1938 deaths
Sportspeople from Madison, Wisconsin
Major League Baseball pitchers
Baseball players from Wisconsin
Wisconsin Badgers baseball players
Cincinnati Reds players
Cleveland Naps players
Boston Red Sox players
Milwaukee Brewers (minor league) players
Milwaukee Creams players
Cleveland Lake Shores players
Grand Rapids Furniture Makers players
St. Paul Saints (Western League) players
St. Paul Saints (AA) players
Toledo Mud Hens players
Los Angeles Angels (minor league) players
Venice Tigers players
Vernon Tigers players